Steven George Polack (born 10 January 1961) is an English football manager and former footballer who also holds a Finnish citizenship. Polack is currently the head coach of Gor Mahia F.C. in Kenya.

Early life 
Polack was born in Birmingham, England to an English mother and a father from the West Indies.

Career 
Polack played 13 seasons and 301 caps for RoPS Rovaniemi and FC Inter in the Finnish premier division Veikkausliiga from 1984 to 1994 and 1996–1997. He is one of the most legendary players of RoPS. After his professional career Polack has been coaching several clubs in Finland as well as King Faisal and Berekum Chelsea in Ghana.Asante kotoko 2017-2018 Ghana
Gor Mahia 2019-2020 Kenia

Honours

As a Player
RoPS
Finnish Cup: 1986

As a Manager
Berekum Chelsea
GHALCA Glo G8 Cup: 2011

Asante Kotoko
MTN Ghanaian FA Cup: 2017–18 
President's Cup: 2017–18 

Gor Mahia
Kenyan Super Cup: 2019
Kenyan Premier League: 2019–20

Individual
MTN Coach of the Year: 2017 Ghana 
Coach of the Month Kenya: October 2019, November 2019, February 2020

References 

1961 births
Footballers from Birmingham, West Midlands
English footballers
English expatriate footballers
Expatriate footballers in Finland
English football managers
Finnish football managers
Veikkausliiga players
Rovaniemen Palloseura players
FC Inter Turku players
FC Inter Turku managers
Expatriate football managers in Ghana
Living people
Association football defenders
Asante Kotoko S.C. managers
English people of West Indian descent
Finnish people of Caribbean descent
Finnish people of English descent
English expatriate sportspeople in Finland
Naturalized citizens of Finland
King Faisal Babes F.C. managers
Ghana Premier League managers